Daniel Baugh Brewster Jr. (November 23, 1923 – August 19, 2007) was an American  politician serving as a Democratic member of the United States Senate, representing the State of Maryland from 1963 until 1969. He was also a member of the Maryland House of Delegates from 1950 to 1958, and a representative from the 2nd congressional district of Maryland in the United States House of Representatives from 1959 to 1963.

Biography

Early life and ancestors
Daniel Baugh Brewster, Jr. was born on November 23, 1923, in Baltimore County, Maryland, in the Green Spring Valley Region. He was one of six children of Ottolie Y. (Wickes) and Daniel Baugh Brewster. He attended the Gilman School in Baltimore, Maryland.

He was a great-grandson of Benjamin H. Brewster, an attorney and politician from New Jersey who served as United States Attorney General from 1881 to 1885 and was himself a descendant of Mayflower passenger William Brewster.

He was also a great-great-great-grandson of Sarah Franklin Bache and Richard Bache and a great-great-great-great-grandson of Benjamin Franklin, one of the Founding Fathers of the United States. He is also related to George Mifflin Dallas (July 10, 1792 – December 31, 1864), a U.S. Senator from Pennsylvania and the 11th Vice President of the United States, serving under James K. Polk.

Education
He was educated at the Gilman School in Baltimore City and St. Paul's School in Concord, New Hampshire. He attended college at Princeton University, and Johns Hopkins University before the U.S. entry into World War II.

After the war, he completed his undergraduate education at Johns Hopkins, then enrolled in the University of Maryland Law School. He was admitted to the Bar in 1949, commencing law practice in Towson, Maryland, soon after.

Personal
Brewster had two sons, Daniel Baugh Brewster, Jr. (1956) and Gerry Leiper Brewster (1958) from his first marriage to Carol Leiper DeHavenon of Philadelphia. They married in 1954, and after thirteen years of marriage, in March 1967, they publicly announced their separation.

On April 29, 1967, Brewster married Anne Moen Bullitt Biddle (1924–2007) at Glyndon, Maryland. She was the daughter of journalist Louise Bryant and William C. Bullitt from their marriage in 1923.  Bryant, her mother, was the widow of John Reed, who wrote Ten Days That Shook the World while living in Moscow through the Bolshevik revolution; while Bullitt, her father, served as ambassador to the Soviet Union and France under President Franklin D. Roosevelt. Anne Biddle was previously married to Caspar Wistar Barton Townsend, Jr., Nicholas Duke Biddle and Roderic More O'Ferrall.  This, Brewster's second marriage, ended in 1969.

In 1976, Brewster married Judy Lynn Aarsand, and had three children, Danielle (1977) and twins Jennilie and Dana (1979).

Military service
In 1942, Brewster enlisted in the United States Marine Corps. He was commissioned from the ranks in 1943. During World War II, he served in the Pacific theatre, including participating in the Battle of Guam and the Battle of Okinawa. For his actions during the war, he received a Bronze Star. He was wounded seven times, receiving a Purple Heart and a Gold Star in lieu of a second award. He left active duty in 1946, but continued in the Reserve until 1972, reaching the rank of colonel.

Political career

Maryland state politics
Brewster, a Democrat, was elected as to the Maryland House of Delegates in 1950 and he served until 1958.

National politics
In 1958, he was elected to the House of Representatives from the 2nd district of Maryland, defeating the Republican candidate, J. Fife Symington, Jr. He was a member of the House during the Eighty-sixth (1959–1961) and Eighty-seventh Congresses (1961–1963)—serving on the House Armed Services Committee and on the subcommittee on Military Personnel, Manpower Utilization, and Emergency Defense Transportation. In the House, Brewster voted for the Civil Rights Act of 1960.

In 1962, he ran for the United States Senate seat vacated by the retiring Republican senator John Marshall Butler, and defeated Congressman Edward Tylor Miller to become the first Democrat elected to the Senate from Maryland since 1946. He served in the Senate from 1963 to 1969. In the Senate, Brewster voted in favor of the Civil Rights Acts of 1964 and 1968, as well as the Voting Rights Act of 1965 and the confirmation of Thurgood Marshall to the U.S. Supreme Court. He was defeated in the 1968 election by Charles Mathias.

In 1964, he ran in the Democratic presidential primaries against segregationist George Wallace. As Lyndon Johnson refused to run nationally, "favorite sons" were run in his place against Wallace, such as Matthew E. Welsh of Indiana and John W. Reynolds of Wisconsin. Brewster won his state's primary but was embarrassed by Wallace's showing of 43 percent. As is required, Maryland delegates to the 1964 Democratic National Convention voted for Brewster on the first ballot, then voted for Lyndon Johnson.

Political positions and voting record

Brewster focused on issues ranging from the presence of communist troops in Cuba in 1963 to proposed cuts in weekend postal service in 1964. His concern with mail practices continued in 1965 when he criticized the current "mail cover" practice which permitted holding up mail to and from persons under investigation. Stressing the importance of the right of privacy, Brewster urged U.S. Postmaster General Larry O'Brien to ban the practice except in cases of treason and national security.

In a November 1966 letter to The New York Times, Brewster declared his support for advertising or "junk" mail, which he claimed accounted for $35 billion in sales. Pointing out that 80% of the mail is for business purposes, Brewster expressed concern over possible unemployment in private business and the postal service if "junk mail" is eliminated. In 1967, he voted for a "junk mail" amendment, which would delay price increases and limit 3rd class mail rates to 3.8 cents a piece. Brewster also played a strong supporting role in national Democratic politics.

Brewster was instrumental in the passage of the monumental Civil Rights Act of 1964.

Bribery charges
In 1969, Brewster was indicted on 10 criminal counts of solicitation and acceptance of bribes while a United States Senator, in his role as a member of the Committee on Post Office and Civil Service; as well as two counts of accepting illegal gratuities.  This stemmed from a campaign contribution by Spiegel, Inc., a mail-order firm.   He contended that he had done nothing wrong.

At trial, the judge dismissed five of the charges, saying that Brewster's actions were protected under the Speech or Debate Clause of the U.S. Constitution. The prosecution appealed directly to the U.S. Supreme Court, which heard the case in 1971 and 1972. In June 1972, the Court held 6 to 3 in United States v. Brewster that the taking of illegal bribes was not protected speech, as taking of a bribe was not part of the "performance of a legislative function."

The charges were reinstated. Brewster stood trial and was found "not guilty" of the bribery charges but was convicted of accepting an unlawful gratuity "without corrupt intent." However, in August 1974,  his conviction was overturned on appeal due to the trial judge's improper instructions to the jury. In 1975, he pleaded no contest to a single misdemeanor charge of accepting an illegal gratuity "without corrupt intent" and was fined and allowed to keep his law license. The government dropped the other charges.

Later years
After leaving the Senate, Brewster took up farming in Glyndon, Maryland.  
He died of liver cancer on August 19, 2007, at age 83.  He is buried at Saint Thomas' Episcopal Church Cemetery, Owings Mills, Maryland.

Legacy
Among Brewster's United States Senate staff in the 1960s were intern Nancy D'Alesandro (later Pelosi) of Baltimore, who as a Congresswoman from California would become Democratic leader and, in 2007, Speaker of the House of Representatives, and Steny Hoyer, who served on Senator Brewster's staff for five years from 1962 to 1966 and who served as House Majority Leader under Pelosi.

See also

List of American federal politicians convicted of crimes
List of federal political scandals in the United States

References

External links 

 Daniel Brewster papers at the University of Maryland Libraries

Notes

 Retrieved on 2008-01-24

|-

|-

1923 births
2007 deaths
20th-century American lawyers
20th-century American politicians
Bullitt family
Candidates in the 1964 United States presidential election
Deaths from cancer in Maryland
Deaths from liver cancer
Democratic Party members of the United States House of Representatives from Maryland
Democratic Party United States senators from Maryland
Franklin family
Gilman School alumni
Johns Hopkins University alumni
Lawyers from Baltimore
Democratic Party members of the Maryland House of Delegates
Military personnel from Baltimore
Politicians from Baltimore
United States Marine Corps colonels
United States Marine Corps personnel of World War II
United States Marine Corps reservists
University of Maryland Francis King Carey School of Law alumni